Christian contemporary hit radio (sometimes abbreviated as Christian CHR) is a radio format that is common in the United States and Australia focusing on playing current and recent music as determined by the contemporary Christian music Top 40.

See also
Contemporary hit radio

References

Radio formats
Contemporary Christian music